The Prince Albert Historical Museum is operated by the Prince Albert Historical Society in Prince Albert, Saskatchewan, Canada. It exhibits the history of the area in the city's first firehall which was constructed in 1912 and operated until 1975. In 1977, the museum opened in the space. On display are various First Nations artefacts, an old fire truck, a firemen's pole, and a Native Dugout Canoe (believed to be a thousand years old). The Prince Albert Historical Museum also houses the city's archives.

Affiliations
The Museum is affiliated with: CMA, CHIN, and Virtual Museum of Canada.

References

External links

 Prince Albert Historical Society
 Prince Albert Historical Museum from Virtual Prince Albert
 Canada's Historic Places listing

1932 establishments in Saskatchewan
Museums established in 1932
History museums in Saskatchewan
Museums in Prince Albert, Saskatchewan
Firefighting museums
Fire stations in Canada